Kaïssa is a Cameroon born world musician. She moved to Paris with her family at thirteen and to New York City in 1996. Kaissa worked on stage and/or in studio with Salif Keita, Manu Dibango, Kofi Olomide, Papa Wemba, Cesária Évora, Martha Wash, Diana Ross, Paul Simon and others. Her first solo album was Looking There.

In 2008, she joined David Byrne on the Songs of David Byrne and Brian Eno Tour.

Notes

External links

Cameroonian musicians
Living people
Year of birth missing (living people)
Jazzhole members